Mohamed Mahmoud Amer (born January 19, 1969) is an Egyptian sport shooter. He is a six-time medalist (two golds, one silver, and three bronze) in men's small-bore rifle prone and three positions at the African Shooting Championships.

At the age of 39, Amer made his official debut for the 2008 Summer Olympics in Beijing, where he competed in the men's 50 m rifle 3 positions. He was able to shoot 390 targets in a prone position, 369 in standing, and 376 in kneeling, for a total score of 1,135 points, finishing only in forty-sixth place.

References

External links
NBC Olympics Profile

1969 births
Living people
Egyptian male sport shooters
Olympic shooters of Egypt
Shooters at the 2008 Summer Olympics
21st-century Egyptian people